Marino Faliero (or Marin Faliero) is a tragedia lirica, or tragic opera, in three acts by Gaetano Donizetti. It is inspired by Lord Byron's drama Marino Faliero (1820) and based on the life of Marino Faliero (c.1285-1355), the Venetian Doge.

Rossini, acting as the Théâtre Italien's music director, had commissioned works by the outstanding Italian composers of the day—Donizetti and Vincenzo Bellini. Both wrote operas for that house in Paris, Bellini's contribution being the hugely-successful I puritani. Donizetti's opera, which premiered on 12 March 1835 (a few months after I puritani) was not nearly as much of a success. However, it marked Donizetti's first opera to have its premiere in Paris.

Performance history

After the Paris première, Marino Faliero was presented in London at Covent Garden on 14 May 1835 and at the Teatro Alfieri in Florence in 1836. Its first appearance in the US took place at the St. Charles Theater in New Orleans on 22 February 1842. However, after several prohibitions from September 1839 onward, the opera was not presented until 3 September 1848, the day to which Black notes was the one on which the composer died in Bergamo. The opera had a number of productions in the 19th century, but by the 20th it had become a rarity. The Donizetti Festival in Bergamo staged the work in 2008.

Roles

Synopsis
Place: Venice
Time: 1355

Act 1
Elena, the wife of Marin Faliero, Doge of Venice, is continually subjected to attacks on her reputation by the patrician Steno whose advances she has rejected. Steno then insults Israele Bertucci, the chief of the Venetian Arsenal in front of his workers. Steno is punished for these offenses, but Faliero is infuriated by the leniency of the punishment. At the Doge's Palace, Israele convinces Faliero to join a conspiracy against the Council of Forty, of which Steno is a member. Elena and her lover Fernando, Faliero's nephew, decide to part. He will leave the city to save her from dishonour. She gives him a veil to remember her by. The climax of the act takes place at a masked ball in the palace when Fernando challenges Steno to a duel for having insulted Elena once again.

Act 2
The duel having taken place, Fernando is found dying near the Basilica dei Santi Giovanni e Paolo, where the conspirators were to meet. Faliero vows to avenge his death.

Act 3
The conspiracy collapses following a betrayal by one of its members and the Doge is condemned to death at a trial in the Doge's Palace. Before his execution, Elena confesses her love affair with Fernando to him. Faliero begins to curse her, but sensing that his death is imminent, pardons her instead. Faliero is led off. Alone on the stage, Elena hears the sound of the executioner's axe, screams and faints.

Recordings

References
Notes

Cited sources
Ashbrook, William; Sarah Hibberd (2001), in  Holden, Amanda (Ed.), The New Penguin Opera Guide, New York: Penguin Putnam. .
Black, John (1982), Donizetti’s Operas in Naples, 1822—1848. London: The Donizetti Society.

Other sources
Allitt, John Stewart (1991), Donizetti: in the light of Romanticism and the teaching of Johann Simon Mayr, Shaftesbury: Element Books, Ltd (UK); Rockport, MA: Element, Inc.(USA)
Ashbrook, William (1982), Donizetti and His Operas, Cambridge University Press.  
Ashbrook, William  (1998), "Marino Falliero" in Stanley Sadie (Ed.), The New Grove Dictionary of Opera, Vol. Three, p. 218. London: MacMillan Publishers, Inc.   
Loewenberg, Alfred (1970). Annals of Opera, 1597-1940, 2nd edition.  Rowman and Littlefield
Osborne, Charles, (1994),  The Bel Canto Operas of Rossini, Donizetti, and Bellini,  Portland, Oregon: Amadeus Press. 
Sadie, Stanley, (Ed.); John Tyrell (Exec. Ed.) (2004), The New Grove Dictionary of Music and Musicians.  2nd edition. London: Macmillan.    (hardcover).   (eBook).
 Weinstock, Herbert (1963), Donizetti and the World of Opera in Italy, Paris, and Vienna in the First Half of the Nineteenth Century, New York: Pantheon Books.

External links
  Donizetti Society (London) website
 Libretto (Italian)
 Marino Falliero, piano reduction of the sxcore, Italian, digitized by BYU on archive.org

Italian-language operas
Operas by Gaetano Donizetti
1835 operas
Operas
Operas based on plays
Operas set in Venice
Cultural depictions of Italian men